John Makin was an English politician.

He was a Member of Parliament (MP) for Colchester in the 16th century.

References

16th-century English MPs
People from Dover, Kent